Clondalkin Rugby Football Club (Irish: Cumann Rugbaí Chluain Dolcáin) is an Irish rugby club based in Clondalkin, Dublin, Ireland. It has a great reputation for being a progressive, family-oriented club as well as being one of Leinster’s fastest growing. The club is known across Ireland as ‘Clon’ or ‘CRFC’, and its grounds are located at Baldonnel, Clondalkin, Dublin 22 (D22 Y9H9). The club was previously located at Kingswood Cross from 1973 to 2022. The club colours are yellow and blue and these colours feature on the club's crest which also includes a round tower, in reference to the 8th century tower located in Clondalkin village.

History 
Clondalkin RFC was founded in 1973 by a group of rugby enthusiasts in this rapidly expanding area of Dublin. Their first game was against Old Kilcullen RFC and the outing confirmed that the potential existed for a rugby club in Clondalkin, so the club was formed and affiliated to the Leinster Branch. For the first five years, the club was based at Moyle Park College, one of the largest secondary schools in Clondalkin and the club adopted the school's colours as an acknowledgement of the support it received from the school in its formative years.

Gradually, the club began to expand, the number of teams in the club grew and a junior section was established. To cater for this expansion, the club purchased grounds at Kingswood Cross, thanks to the hard work and dedication of the committee and club members, and the invaluable support of local businesses and the community. Instrumental in the move was a local bank manager and club member, Paddy Gordon, after whom the grounds were named.

Present Day 
Owing to the outstanding growth and success of the club, in 2022, 'Clon' moved to new, larger grounds in the area, in order to facilitate the rapid expansion of the club. It currently has three senior men's teams, a senior women's team and a thriving youth and mini section featuring players from the ages of 5 up to 18 - boys and girls. The senior men's first team compete in Leinster League (J1) Division 2A, while the senior women's team compete in Division 2. Many current and former senior players now help to coach the youth and mini teams, developing the Clon stars of the future. Current Leinster star, James Lowe is a friend of, and regular visitor to, the club and gives tremendous encouragement to the club's young players.

References

Rugby union clubs in South Dublin (county)
Rugby clubs established in 1973